Eleios-Pronnoi is a former municipality on the island of Kefalonia, Ionian Islands, Greece. Since the 2019 local government reform it is part of the municipality Argostoli, of which it is a municipal unit. The municipal unit has an area of 111.687 km2. Population 3,677 (2011 census). The seat of the municipality was in Pastra (pop. 133). The municipal unit contains several mountain ranges, including the eastern part of Mount Ainos. Its largest towns are Póros (pop. 930), Skála (760), and Agía Eiríni (314).

Population

Subdivisions
The municipal unit Eleios-Pronnoi is subdivided into the following communities (constituent villages in brackets):
Agia Eirini
Agios Nikolaos
Arginia
Chionata (Chionata, Kolaitis, Thiramonas)
Markopoulo (Markopoulo, Kateleios, Kato Kateleios)
Mavrata
Pastra (Pastra, Kremmydi)
Poros (Poros, Asprogerakas, Kampitsata, Riza, Tzanata)
Skala (Skala, Aleimmatas, Fanies, Ratzakli)
Valerianos (Valerianos, Atsoupades, Plateies)
Xenopoulo (Xenopoulo, Andriolata, Kapandriti)

References

External links
Official website 
GTP - Municipality of Eleios-Pronnoi

 
Populated places in Cephalonia